Martuni may refer to:

Places
 Martuni, Armenia, a town on the southern shores of Lake Sevan, Gegharkunik Province, Armenia
 Martuni (village), a village on the northern side of Lake Sevan, Gegharkunik Province, Armenia
 Martuni Province, a province of the de facto Republic of Artsakh
 Martuni, Nagorno-Karabakh, or Khojavend, the provincial capital of Martuni Province
 Martuni District, a district of the former Nagorno-Karabakh Autonomous Oblast of the Soviet Union
 Günəşli, Shamkir or Martuni, Azerbaijan

People
 Alexander Miasnikian or Martuni (1886-1925), Armenian Bolshevik revolutionary and official

See also